Reservoirs in Hong Kong are spread fairly evenly over the entire 1,104 km² of Hong Kong. There is plenty of space for small reservoirs in Hong Kong, as the hilly areas provide valleys suitable for water storage. However, the larger reservoirs, i.e. High Island Reservoir and Plover Cove Reservoir, were built differently. Dams were built where the reservoir's edge was proposed to be, sea water was drained out and replaced with fresh water.

Drinking-water reservoirs

New Territories 
High Island Reservoir
Plover Cove Reservoir
Shing Mun Reservoirs
Shing Mun (Jubilee) Reservoir
Lower Shing Mun Reservoir
Tai Lam Chung Reservoir

Kowloon 
Kowloon Group of Reservoirs
Kowloon Reservoir
Kowloon Byewash Reservoir
Kowloon Reception Reservoir
Shek Lei Pui Reservoir

Hong Kong Island 
Aberdeen Reservoirs
Aberdeen Upper Reservoir
Aberdeen Lower Reservoir
Pok Fu Lam Reservoir
Tai Tam Reservoirs
Tai Tam Upper Reservoir
Tai Tam Byewash Reservoir
Tai Tam Intermediate Reservoir
Tai Tam Tuk Reservoir
Wong Nai Chung Reservoir

Lantau Island 
Discovery Bay Reservoir (愉景灣水塘)
Shek Pik Reservoir

Irrigation reservoirs 

Ho Pui Reservoir
Hok Tau Reservoir
Hung Shui Hang Reservoir
Inspiration Lake
Lam Tei Reservoir
Lau Shui Heung Reservoir
Sham Tseng Settlement Basin
Shap Long Reservoir
Tsing Tam Reservoirs
Tsing Tam Upper Reservoir
Tsing Tam Lower Reservoir
Wong Nai Tun Reservoir
Kwu Tung Reservoir

Flushing-water reservoirs 
Ma Yau Tong Reservoir (馬游塘水塘)
Jordan Valley Reservoir - closed in late 1970s.

See also

Water supply in Hong Kong
Conservation in Hong Kong
List of dams and reservoirs

References
This article draws information from the corresponding article in Chinese Wikipedia.
2007. 2007 Hong Kong Map. Easy Finder Ltd.

External links

 Waterworks of a Century
 Reservoirs of Hong Kong - in Chinese

Reservoirs

Reservoirs, Hong Kong